Ward George Wohlmann  (1872–1956) was a notable New Zealand policeman and police commissioner. He was born in Invercargill, New Zealand, in 1872.

In the 1934 King's Birthday Honours, Wohlmann was appointed a Companion of the Imperial Service Order. In the 1935 New Zealand Royal Visit Honours, he was made a Member (fourth class) of the Royal Victorian Order, and later that year he was awarded the King George V Silver Jubilee Medal.

References

1872 births
1956 deaths
New Zealand police officers
People from Invercargill
New Zealand Lieutenants of the Royal Victorian Order
New Zealand Companions of the Imperial Service Order